Susan Henrichs became provost of the University of Alaska Fairbanks (UAF) in July 2007, after serving as dean of the Graduate School and vice provost of UAF from 2003 to 2007.

Career
Henrichs was born and raised in Anchorage, Alaska. She earned a bachelor's degree in chemistry and chemical oceanography from the University of Washington in 1975, and a Ph.D. in chemical oceanography from the Massachusetts Institute of Technology-Woods Hole Oceanographic Institution joint program in 1980. From 1981 to 1982  she worked as a postdoctoral research chemist at Scripps Institution of Oceanography. She joined the UAF faculty in 1982 as an assistant professor of marine science in the Institute of Marine Science, which is part of the School of Fisheries and Ocean Sciences. She attained the rank of professor in 1994. Henrichs served as program head of the graduate program in marine sciences and limnology from 1994 to 2003. Her research specialty is marine organic chemistry. Henrichs and her graduate students have studied the detritus of food webs in the Bering Sea and Gulf of Alaska, hydrocarbon contaminants in Kachemak Bay sediments, the adsorption of organic substances by marine sediment particles, and organic matter deposition and preservation patterns in marine sediments. From 1993 to 2007 she has served as the Radiation Safety Officer at UAF.

Selected publications
 Wang, D., S. M. Henrichs, and L. Guo.  2006.  Distributions of nutrients, dissolved organic carbon and carbohydrates in the Western Arctic Ocean.  Continental Shelf Research 26: 1654–1667.
 Henrichs, S. M.  2005.  Organic matter in coastal marine sediments.  In A. R. Robinson and K. H. Brink, eds., The Sea, Volume 13. The Global Coastal Ocean: Multiscale Interdisciplinary Processes.  Harvard University Press, Boston, pp. 129–162.
 Smith, S. L., S. M. Henrichs, and T. Rho.  2002.  Temporal and spatial variation in the stable carbon and nitrogen isotopic composition of sinking particles and zooplankton over the southeastern Bering Sea shelf.  Deep-Sea Research Part II 49: 6031–6050.
 Ding, X., and S. M. Henrichs.  2002.  Adsorption and desorption of proteins and polyamino acids by clay minerals and marine sediments. Marine Chemistry 77: 225–237.
 Alexander, V., S. M. Henrichs, and H. J. Niebauer. 1996.  Bering Sea ice dynamics and primary production.  Proceedings of the National Institute of Polar Research Symposium on Polar Biology 9: 13–25.
 Henrichs, S. M.  1995.  Sedimentary organic matter preservation: An assessment and speculative synthesis - a comment.  Marine Chemistry 49: 127–136.

References

University of Alaska Fairbanks faculty
People from Anchorage, Alaska
University of Washington College of the Environment alumni
Massachusetts Institute of Technology alumni
Living people
Year of birth missing (living people)